Juan Carlos Reveco (born August 21, 1983) is an Argentine professional boxer who has held the WBA light flyweight title and the WBA (Regular) light flyweight and flyweight titles.

Professional career

Reveco turned professional in 2004. In June 2007, he knocked out undefeated Nethra Sasiprapa to capture the vacant WBA Light Flyweight Title, but lost the title in his first defense to Brahim Asloum on December 8, 2007. 

He won the Vacant WBA Interim Light Flyweight Title on December 18, 2009 against Ronald Barrera, and was later promoted to full champion.  In February 2011, he vacated his light flyweight title in order to be ranked in the flyweight division.

Reveco vs. Ioka 
On December 31, 2015, Reveco fought Kazuto Ioka for the WBA flyweight title. Ioka won the fight in the eleventh round via technical knockout.

Reveco vs. Nantapech 
On September 8, 2017, Reveco fought Komgrich Nantapech. Nantapech was ranked #4 by the IBF and #15 by the WBC at flyweight. Reveco won the fight convincingly via unanimous decision, 120-108, 118-110 and 117-111 on the scorecards.

Reveco vs. Nietes 
In his next bout, Reveco fought Donnie Nietes for the IBF flyweight title. Nietes won the fight via a seventh round technical knockout.

Professional boxing record

See also
List of world light-flyweight boxing champions
List of world flyweight boxing champions

References

External links

Juan Carlos Reveco - Profile, News Archive & Current Rankings at Box.Live

|-

|-

|-

|-

1983 births
Living people
Argentine male boxers
Sportspeople from Mendoza Province
Light-flyweight boxers
Flyweight boxers
World light-flyweight boxing champions
World flyweight boxing champions
World Boxing Association champions